was a Japanese actor. He graduated from Rikkyō University and originally wanted to be a director, but ended up debuting as an actor at Tōhō in 1941. He did not achieve popularity until starring in a series of youth films in the late 1940s. He expanded his acting range in the 1950s, while still frequently appearing in genre films, such as Tōhō tokusatsu films and yakuza films at Tōei. He was also known as an essayist. On 8 October 2010, he died of blood poisoning. He was 92 years old.

Selected filmography

Film

 The Sky of Hope (1942) - Tsutomu
 Midori no daichi (1942) - Kome Yan
 Yottsu no koi no monogatari (1947) - Masao (episode 1)
 Sensô to heiwa (1947)
 Haru no kyôen (1947) - Sampei Hayasaka
 Ai yo hoshi to tomo ni (1947)
 Sono yo no boken (1948)
 Hakai (1948) - Segawa
 Niizuma kaigi (1949)
 Koi no jusan yoru (1949)
 Shin'ya no kokuhaku (1949) - Newspaper Reporter Moriguchi Shigeya
 Aoi sanmyaku (青い山脈) (1949) - Rokusuke Kaneya
 Zoku aoi sanmyaku (1949) - Rokusuke Kaneya
 Kikoku (Damoi) (1949)
 Rinchi (1949) - Nobuo Sugawara
 Escape at Dawn (暁の脱走, Akatsuki no dasso) (1950) - Mikami
 Ishinaka sensei gyôjôki (1950)
 Bōryoku no Machi (ペン偽らず　暴力の街 Pen itsurazu: Bōryoku no machi) (1950)
 Onna no shiki (1950)
 Tsuma to onna kisha: Wakai ai no kiki (1950) - Ryôhei Kajimoto
 Yama no kanata ni - Dai ichi-bu: Ringo no hoo (1950)
 Yama no kanata ni - Dai ni-bu: Sakana no seppun (1950)
 Akatsuki no tsuiseki (1950)
 Yama no kanata ni - Dai ichi-bu: Ringo no hoo: Dai ni-bu: Sakana no seppun - Sôshûhen (1950)
 Ai to nikushimi no kanata e (1951)
 Takarazuka fujin (1951)
 Wakai musumetachi (1951) - Kawasaki
 Nessa no byaku ran (1951)
 Hakamadare Yasusuke (1951)
 Aoi shinju (1951)
 Wakôdo no uta (1951)
 Bungawan soro (1951)
 Onnagokoro dare ka shiru (1951)
 Koi no rantô (1951)
 Koibito (1951)
 Kaze futatabi (1952)
 Asa no hamon (1952) - Niheita Inobe
 Kin no tamago: Golden girl (1952)
 Wakai hito (1952)
 Gendai-jin (現代人 Gendaijin) (1952)
 Ashi ni sawatta onna (1952) - Gohei
 Oka wa hanazakari (1952) - Masaya Nozaki
 Yoru no owari (1953) - Shinji Kizaki
 Tokai no yokogao (1953) - Ueda [sandwich man]
 Ashita wa dotchi da (1953) - Saniwa
 Botchan (1953) - Botchan
 Bochan (1953)
 Chi no hate made (1953)
 Onna gokoro wa hitosuji ni (1953) - Gintarô
 Farewell Rabaul (1954) - Captain Wakabayashi
 Kaze tachinu (1954) - Eyoichi Fukuyama
 Geisha Konatsu (1954) - Kubo
 Watashi no subete o (1954) - Saburo Seki
 Kimi shinitamo koto nakare (1954)
 Ani-san no aijô (1954)
 Koi-gesho (1955) - Rikiya Kizu
 Owarai torimonocho-hatchan hatsutegara (1955)
 Fumetsu no nekkyû (1955)
 Sanjusan go sha otonashi (1955)
 The Lone Journey (旅路, Tabiji) (1955) - Naojiro Mikazuki
 Rangiku monogatari (乱菊物語) (1956)
 Early Spring (早春 Sōshun) (1956) - Shôji Sugiyama
 Kyûketsu-ga (1956) - Kôsuke Kindaichi
 Kon'yaku sanbagarasu (1956)
 Gendai no yokubô (1956) - Hiroshi Tanigawa
 The Legend of the White Serpent (白夫人の妖恋, Byaku fujin no yoren) (1956) - Xu Xian
 Kojinbutu no fufu (1956)
 Ani to sono musume (1956) - Kaisuke Mamiya
 Bôkyaku no hanabira (1957)
 Snow Country (雪国 Yukiguni) (1957) - Shimamura
 Bôkyaku no hanabira: Kanketsuhen (1957)
 Yuunagi (1957) - Kosuke Igawa
 Datsugokushû (1957)
 Shizukanaru otoko (1957)
 Ankoru watto monogatari utsukushiki aishu (1958) - Shun'ichi Kawai
 A Holiday in Tokyo (東京の休日, Tōkyō no kyūjitsu) (1958) - Senpai
 Yajikata dôchû sugoroku (1958) - Ryônosuke Taya
 Daigaku no ninkimono (1958) - Coach Urano
 Jinsei gekijô - Seishun hen (1958)
 Kodama wa yonde iru (1959) - Seizô Nabayama
 Tegami o kakeru (1959)
 Submarine I-57 Will Not Surrender (潜水艦イ-57降伏せず, Sensuikan I-57 kofuku sezu) (1959)
 Anyakôro (1959) - Kensaku Tokito
 Oneechan makari tôru (1959)
 Battle in Outer Space (宇宙大戦争, Uchū daisensō) (1959) - Maj. Ichiro Katsumiya
 Kêisatsû-kan to bôryôku-dan (1959)
 Hawai Middowei daikaikûsen: Taiheiyô no arashi (1960)
 Man Against Man (1960) - Kikumori
 Sararîman Chûshingura (1960) - Takuni Asano
 Jiyûgaoka fujin (1960)
 Toiretto shacho (1961)
 Toilet buchô (1961) - Noboru Kasajima
 Kuroi gashû dainibu: Kanryû (1961)
 Kaei (1961)
 Gorath (妖星ゴラス, Yōsei Gorasu) (1962) - Dr. Tazawa - Astrophysicist
 Ika naru hoshi no moto ni (1962) - Kurahashi
 Chūshingura: Hana no Maki, Yuki no Maki (1962) - Chikara Tsuchiya
 Attack Squadron! (1963)
 Chintao yôsai bakugeki meirei (1963)
 Pale Flower (乾いた花, Kawaita  hana) (1964) - Muraki
 Haigo no hito (1965) - Yoshio Shido
 Daikon to ninjin (1965) - Kotaki
 Oshaberi na shinju (1965)
 Kemonomichi (1965) - Shôjirô Kotaki
 Shôwa zankyô-den (1965) - Kazama
 Shôwa zankyô-den: Karajishi botan (1966)
 Showa zankyo-den: Ippiki okami (1966)
 Otoko dokyô de shobû (1966)
 Shôwa zankyô-den: Chizome no karajishi (1967) - Jûkichi Kazama
 Zankyô Abarehada (1967) - Kyohei Shigemasa
 San-nin no bakuto (1967)
 Otoko no shobu: kantô arashî (1967)
 Moeru kumo (1967)
 Ah kaiten tokubetsu kogetikai (1968)
 Rikugun chôhô 33 (1968) - Suharut Danan
 Gokuchu no kaoyaku (1968)
 Ah, yokaren (1968) - Staff Officer Matsumoto
 Shôwa zankyô-den: Karajishi jingi (1969)
 Chôkôsô no akebono (1969)
 Gendai yakuza: Yotamono jingi (1969) - Goro's elder brother
 Tosei-nin Retsuden (1969)
 Shushô jingi: O-inochi chôdai (1969)
 Showa zankyo-den: Hito-kiri karajishi (1969)
 Shôwa zankyô-den: Shinde moraimasu (1970)
 Nihon boryoku-dan: kumicho kuzure (1970)
 Battle of Okinawa (1971)
 Showa zankyo-den: hoero karajishi (1971)
 Showa zankyo-den: Yabure-gasa (1972)
 Hikage-mono (1972)
 Bokyo Komori-uta (1972)
 Chokugeki! Jigoku-ken (1974) - Arashiyama
 Chokugeki jigoku-ken: Dai-gyakuten (1974) - Arashiyama
 Â kessen kôkûtai (1974)
 Saikai (1975)
 Hi no ataru sakamichi (1975)
 Kimi yo fundo no kawa wo watare (1976) - Ito
 The War in Space (惑星大戦争, Wakusei daisensō) (1977) - Professor Takigawa
 Tarao Bannai (1978) - Nobuyuki Kinomata
 Kaichô-on (1980) - Riichiro Ujima
 Station (駅 STATION, Eki Station) (1981) - Chief Nakagawa
 Shōsetsu Yoshida gakkō (小説吉田学校) (1983) - Taketora Ogata
 Izakaya Chôji (1983) - Horie
 The Audition (1984) - Shozo godai
 Mishima: A Life in Four Chapters (1985) - Interrogator (segment "Runaway Horses")
 Hitohira no yuki (1985)
 Lost in the Wilderness (1986) - Sanada
 Umi e (1988)
 Aoi sanmyaku '88 (1988) - Zenbei Terazawa

Television dramas
Karei-naru Ichizoku (1974–75) - Shōichi Mikumo
Sanga Moyu (1984) - Kenny Matsubara
Dokuganryū Masamune (1987) - Sen no Rikyū

References

Bibliography

External links
 
 

Japanese male film actors
1918 births
2010 deaths
Rikkyo University alumni
20th-century Japanese male actors
Place of birth missing